Mohammad Jumaa Al-Alawi (Arabic:محمد جمعة العلوي) (born 24 June 1986) is a Qatari footballer. He currently plays for Al-Rayyan.

External links
 

Qatari footballers
1986 births
Living people
El Jaish SC players
Al-Shamal SC players
Al-Rayyan SC players
Al-Khor SC players
Al-Arabi SC (Qatar) players
Al-Sailiya SC players
Qatar Stars League players
Qatari Second Division players
Association football fullbacks